Colombia competed at the 2016 Summer Paralympics in Rio de Janeiro, Brazil, from 7 to 18 September 2016.

Delegation 
Colombia sent a team of 39 athletes, 26 men and 13 women, and 1 official to the 2016 Summer Paralympics.

Disability classifications

Every participant at the Paralympics has their disability grouped into one of five disability categories; amputation, the condition may be congenital or sustained through injury or illness; cerebral palsy; wheelchair athletes, there is often overlap between this and other categories; visual impairment, including blindness; Les autres, any physical disability that does not fall strictly under one of the other categories, for example dwarfism or multiple sclerosis. Each Paralympic sport then has its own classifications, dependent upon the specific physical demands of competition. Events are given a code, made of numbers and letters, describing the type of event and classification of the athletes competing. Some sports, such as athletics, divide athletes by both the category and severity of their disabilities, other sports, for example swimming, group competitors from different categories together, the only separation being based on the severity of the disability.

Medalists

Cycling 

With one pathway for qualification being one highest ranked NPCs on the UCI Para-Cycling male and female Nations Ranking Lists on 31 December 2014, Colombia qualified for the 2016 Summer Paralympics in Rio, assuming they continued to meet all other eligibility requirements.

Wheelchair tennis 
Colombia qualified one competitors in the men's single event, Eliecer Oquendo.  This spot was a result of a Bipartite Commission Invitation place.  Colombia also earned a spot in the women's singles event. Angelica Bernal got the spot as a result of a Bipartite Commission Invitation place.

See also
Colombia at the 2016 Summer Olympics

References

Nations at the 2016 Summer Paralympics
2016
2016 in Colombian sport